Emőke Patrícia Pápai (born 24 June 2003) is a Hungarian footballer who plays as a defender for Grasshopper and the Hungary women's national team.

Career
Pápai is a member of the Hungary senior national team. She made her debut for the team on 13 April 2021 against Bosnia and Herzegovina, coming on as a substitute for Lilla Turányi.

Playing style
Pápai has received praise for her technical and physical abilities on the football pitch. Her ability to score numerous goals has also been noted.

International goals

References

2003 births
Living people
Women's association football defenders
Hungarian women's footballers
Hungary women's international footballers
Grasshopper Club Zürich (women) players
MTK Hungária FC (women) players
Swiss Women's Super League players